Vanna is a feminine first name.

Vanna may also refer to:

People
 Vanna (singer), Croatian singer
 Duong Vanna, Cambodian politician
 Lisa De Vanna, Australian footballer
 Nina Vanna, British film actress
 Vanna White, American game show host

Places
 Vanna (Troms), an island in Karlsøy municipality, Troms county, Norway
 Vanna, Georgia, United States

Other uses
 Vanna (band), an American hardcore punk band
 Vanna (finance), in quantitative finance

See also
 Monna Vanna (disambiguation)